The 2018 Thailand Masters, officially the Princess Sirivannavari Thailand Masters 2018, was a badminton tournament which took place at Nimibutr Stadium in Thailand from 9 to 14 January 2018 and had a total purse of $150,000.

Tournament
The 2018 Thailand Masters was the first tournament of the 2018 BWF World Tour and also part of the Thailand Masters championships which had been held since 2016. This tournament was organized by the Badminton Association of Thailand with sanction from the BWF. It was also the first ever new Super 300 Level 5 tournament of the BWF World Tour schedule.

Venue
This international tournament was held at Nimibutr Stadium in Bangkok, Thailand.

Point distribution
Below is a table with the point distribution for each phase of the tournament based on the BWF points system for the BWF World Tour Super 300 event.

Prize money
The total prize money for this tournament was US$150,000. Distribution of prize money was in accordance with BWF regulations.

Men's singles

Seeds

 Tanongsak Saensomboonsuk (second round)
 Tommy Sugiarto (champion)
 Khosit Phetpradab (first round)
 Hu Yun (quarterfinals)
 Ygor Coelho de Oliveira (first round)
 Mark Caljouw (withdrew)
 Lee Cheuk Yiu (first round)
 Zulfadli Zulkiffli (first round)

Finals

Top half

Section 1

Section 2

Bottom half

Section 3

Section 4

Women's singles

Seeds

 Nitchaon Jindapol (champion)
 Busanan Ongbumrungpan (withdrew)
 Pornpawee Chochuwong (final) 
 Sonia Cheah Su Ya (semifinals)
 Yip Pui Yin (second round)
 Dinar Dyah Ayustine (first round)
 Gregoria Mariska Tunjung (quarterfinals)
 Goh Jin Wei (second round)

Finals

Top half

Section 1

Section 2

Bottom half

Section 3

Section 4

Men's doubles

Seeds

 Berry Angriawan / Hardianto (semifinals)
 Fajar Alfian / Muhammad Rian Ardianto (quarterfinals)
 Goh V Shem / Tan Wee Kiong (semifinals)
 Ong Yew Sin / Teo Ee Yi (quarterfinals)
 Kittinupong Kedren / Dechapol Puavaranukroh (first round)
 Low Juan Shen / Chooi Kah Ming (first round)
 Wahyu Nayaka / Ade Yusuf (final)
 Jacco Arends / Ruben Jille (first round)

Finals

Top half

Section 1

Section 2

Bottom half

Section 3

Section 4

Women's doubles

Seeds

 Jongkolphan Kititharakul / Rawinda Prajongjai (champions)
 Anggia Shitta Awanda / Ni Ketut Mahadewi Istarani (final)
 Chow Mei Kuan / Lee Meng Yean (semifinals)
 Chayanit Chaladchalam / Phataimas Muenwong (quarterfinals)  
 Della Destiara Haris / Rizki Amelia Pradipta (quarterfinals)
 Setyana Mapasa / Gronya Somerville (quarterfinals)
 Selena Piek / Cheryl Seinen (first round)
 Johanna Goliszewski / Lara Kaepplein (second round)

Finals

Top half

Section 1

Section 2

Bottom half

Section 3

Section 4

Mixed doubles

Seeds

 Hee Yong Kai / Tan Wei Han (withdrew)
 Ronan Labar / Audrey Fontaine (quarterfinals)
 Sawan Serasinghe / Setyana Mapasa (quarterfinals)
 Jacco Arends / Selena Piek (quarterfinals)
 Chan Peng Soon / Goh Liu Ying (champions)
 Vitalij Durkin / Nina Vislova (first round)
 Dechapol Puavaranukroh / Puttita Supajirakul (final)
 Robin Tabeling / Cheryl Seinen (first round)

Finals

Top half

Section 1

Section 2

Bottom half

Section 3

Section 4

References

External links
 Tournament Link

Thailand Masters
Badminton, World Tour, Thailand Masters
Badminton, World Tour, Thailand Masters
Thailand Masters (badminton)
Badminton, World Tour, Thailand Masters